The golden Oldfield mouse or golden thomasomys (Thomasomys aureus) is a species of rodent in the family Cricetidae. It is found in Colombia, Ecuador, Peru, and Venezuela. Both the common and genus name commemorate the British zoologist Oldfield Thomas who worked at the Natural History Museum, London and studied South American rodents.

Description
The dorsal fur is thick, coarse, and long, a golden-brown colour grizzled with grey, with a narrow dark line along the spine. The ventral fur consists of grey hairs with yellowish tips. The tail is unicoloured and ringed, clad with short hair and lacking a "pencil" (tuft of hairs) at its tip. The tail is 125 to 140% of the head-and-body length.

Distribution and habitat
The species occurs in forests in the foothills of the Andes. Its range extends from western Venezuela and eastern Colombia through most of Ecuador and Peru, and western central Bolivia.

Ecology
This mouse is partly arboreal. It has been found on horizontal branches making paths between the mosses and liverworts, and also on the ground with well-worn routes among the grasses and clumps of moss. Nests have been found in trees a few metres above the ground. The diet includes vegetable matter, fruits, seeds and small invertebrates.

Status
The golden Oldfield mouse has a wide range and is a fairly common species in most parts of its range, though less common in Ecuador. Deforestation is occurring throughout its range and populations may be declining, but the total population is likely to be large and any downward trend in populations is probably slow, so the International Union for Conservation of Nature has assessed its conservation status as being of "least concern".

References

Thomasomys
Mammals of Colombia
Mammals described in 1860
Taxonomy articles created by Polbot